Childwickbury Manor is a manor house in the hamlet of Childwickbury, Hertfordshire, England, between St Albans and Harpenden.

History
The Lomax family bought the house in 1666 and lived there until 1854 when Joshua Lomax sold it to Henry Hayman Toulmin, a wealthy ship owner, High Sheriff of Hertfordshire and mayor of St Albans. Toulmin left the property to Sir John Blundell Maple around 20 years later. Toulmin's granddaughter, the author Mary Carbery, was born at the house.

Sir John Blundell Maple, 1st Baronet bred and raced thoroughbreds and built Childwickbury Stud into a very successful horse breeding operation. Another prominent racehorse owner, Jack Barnato Joel, bought the estate including the stud farm in 1906. On his death in 1940, his son Jim Joel took over the operation. He too became a successful racehorse owner and breeder and maintained the property until 1978 when the stud and the manor were sold separately.

It was advertised thus:

"The Manor House, mainly 18th century has 12 Reception Rooms, 18 Bed and Dressing Rooms, 11 Staff Bedrooms, and 10 Bathrooms. Immaculate Timbered Grounds. Walled Garden. Courtyard with Garaging and Flat. Estate Office. Victorian Dairy House with about 19 Acres [77,000 m2]. Two Coach House Cottages with Magnificent Stable Yard with Paddock and Woodland 16 Acres [65,000 m2]. Cheapside and Shafford Farms, 2 Well Equipped Corn and Stock Farms with about 724 Acres [2.9 km2]. 146 Acres [591,000 m2] of Timbered Parkland, 37 Acres [150,000 m2] of Railed Paddock and 104 Acres [421,000 m2] of valuable Commercial Timber". In addition there were "18 Attractive Houses and Cottages, some with Paddocks. Old Mill and other Buildings for conversion, Stud Buildings, 30 Loose Boxes, Potential Riding School, and fishing in River Ver and Mill Race. Total 1,100 Acres [4.5 km2]"

The stud was sold to the Marquesa de Moratalla.

Current owner
Film director Stanley Kubrick bought the manor in 1978. He used the estate as both a home and a nerve centre for his film productions. He lived there until his death in 1999 and is interred in its grounds together with his eldest daughter Anya Kubrick, who died in 2009. His widow, Christiane Kubrick, still lives in the Manor House and one of their grandchildren runs a recording studio adjacent to it as a sound engineer.

References

External links
 Childwickbury Estate

Country houses in Hertfordshire
Grade II listed buildings in Hertfordshire
Grade II listed houses
Stanley Kubrick